The 2017–18 season is Millwall's 133rd year in existence, 92nd consecutive season in The Football League and 41st in the second tier. Millwall return to The Championship after a two-year absence. They secured promotion from League One via the playoffs. The Lions went on a club record 17-game unbeaten run; their longest streak in the second tier, which surpassed a record of 15 set in 1971. This season Millwall won six away wins in a row, equalling a club record set in the 2008–09 season.  The Lions finished in eighth position, their highest league finish since the 2001–02 season. Millwall competed in the FA Cup, losing to Rochdale in a Fourth round replay. They also took part in the League Cup, going out to Reading in the Second round. The season covers the period from 1 July 2017 to 30 June 2018.

Pre-season

Friendlies
Millwall announced four pre-season friendlies against Dartford, Barnet, Stevenage and Spanish side Granada.

Competitions

Championship

League table

Result summary

Results by matchday

Matches
On 21 June 2017, the league fixtures were announced.

FA Cup
In the FA Cup, Millwall entered the competition in the third round and were drawn at home against Barnsley.

EFL Cup
On 16 June 2017, the first round draw took place with Stevenage the visitors confirmed. An away tie against Reading was announced for the second round.

Squad

Statistics

|-
|colspan=14|Player(s) out on loan:

|-
|colspan=14|Player(s) left the club:

|}

Goals record

Disciplinary record

Transfers

Transfers in

Loans in

Transfers out

Loans out

References

Millwall
Millwall F.C. seasons